Betsy Holland (born January 10, 1976) is an American politician. She is a Democrat representing the 54th district in the Georgia House of Representatives.

Political career 

In 2018, Holland ran for election to represent District 54 in the Georgia House of Representatives. She won a three-way Democratic primary with 60.6% of the vote, and defeated Republican incumbent Beth Beskin in the general election. She is running for reelection in 2020.

As of July 2020, Holland sits on the following committees:
 Higher Education
 Intragovernmental Cooperation
 Small Business Development

Electoral record

References 

Living people
Democratic Party members of the Georgia House of Representatives
21st-century American politicians
21st-century American women politicians
Women state legislators in Georgia (U.S. state)
1976 births